Toru Takahashi may refer to:

, Japanese baseball player
, Japanese computer network researcher and businessman
 Toru Takahashi (manager), CEO of Japan Post Holdings
, Japanese racing driver

See also
 See 高橋徹 on Japanese Wikipedia for a further list
 Takahashi (disambiguation)
 Toru (disambiguation)